Juwita Niza Wasni (born August 8, 1996) is a retired wushu taolu athlete from Indonesia. She is a two-time world champion, double gold medalist at the Taolu World Cup, and a four-time medalist at the Southeast Asian Games. At the 2014 Asian Games, she won the gold medal in women's nanquan due to the doping disqualification of Malaysian athlete Tai Cheau Xuen.

See also 

 List of Asian Games medalists in wushu

References

External Links 
 Athlete profile at the 2018 Asian Games

1996 births
Living people
Indonesian wushu practitioners
Wushu practitioners at the 2014 Asian Games
Wushu practitioners at the 2018 Asian Games
Asian Games gold medalists for Indonesia
Asian Games medalists in wushu
Medalists at the 2014 Asian Games
Southeast Asian Games gold medalists for Indonesia
Southeast Asian Games silver medalists for Indonesia
Southeast Asian Games bronze medalists for Indonesia
Southeast Asian Games medalists in wushu
Competitors at the 2013 Southeast Asian Games
Competitors at the 2015 Southeast Asian Games
Competitors at the 2017 Southeast Asian Games